The mixed doubles event of the 2017 BWF World Junior Championships was a badminton world junior individual championships for the Eye Level Cups, held on between 16 and 22 October 2017. The defending champions were He Jiting and Du Yue from China.

Seeds 

  Kim Won-ho / Lee Yu-rim (fourth round)
  Na Sung-seung / Seong Ah-yeong (fourth round)
  Rehan Naufal Kusharjanto / Siti Fadia Silva Ramadhanti (final)
  Yeremia Rambitan / Angelica Wiratama (quarter-finals)
  Wang Chan / Kim Min-ji (fourth round)
  Thom Gicquel / Vimala Hériau (third round)
  Ruttanapak Oupthong / Chasinee Korepap (fourth round)
  Ye Hong-wei / Teng Chun-hsun (second round)

  Ng Eng Cheong / Toh Ee Wei (quarter-finals)
  Robert Cybulski / Wiktoria Dabczynska (second round)
  Rinov Rivaldy / Pitha Haningtyas Mentari (champions)
  Carl Harrbacka / Tilda Sjoo (second round)
  Chang Yee Jun / Pearly Tan Koong Le (fourth round)
  Eloi Adam / Juliette Moinard (second round)
  Dhruv Kapila / Mithula Umakant (second round)
  Su Li-wei / Li Zi-qing (second round)

Draw

Finals

Top half

Section 1

Section 2

Section 3

Section 4

Bottom half

Section 5

Section 6

Section 7

Section 8

References

External links
Main Draw

Mixed
World Junior